The 1973 UCLA Bruins football team represented the University of California, Los Angeles during the 1973 NCAA Division I football season.  the Pacific-8 Conference, the Bruins were led by third-year head coach Pepper Rodgers and played their home games at the 

Quarterbacks Mark Harmon and John Sciarra ran the wishbone offense, and the Bruins were 9–2 overall and 6–1 om the Pac-8.

Schedule

 Prior to the 1975 season, the Pac-8 and Big Ten conferences allowed only one postseason participant each, for the Rose Bowl.

Roster
QB Mark Harmon
PK Efrén Herrera
RB Kermit Johnson
FB James McAlister
QB John Sciarra
FS Jim Bright
LB Jack Jorgensen
C Randy Cross
LB Fulton Kuykendall

Awards and honors
First Team All Americans: Jimmy Allen (DB), Efrén Herrera (K), Kermit Johnson (RB, Consensus selection), James McAlister (RB), Fred McNeill (DE)
All Conference First Team: Jimmy Allen (DB), James Bright (DB), Kermit Johnson (RB), Ed Kezirian (OT), Steve Klosterman (OG), Fulton Kuykendall (LB), Fred McNeill (DE), John Nanoski (DB), Al Oliver (OT), Cal Peterson (DE)

References

UCLA
UCLA Bruins football seasons
UCLA Bruins football
UCLA Bruins football